Prostasomes are extracellular vesicles (40-500 nm in diameter) secreted by the prostate gland epithelial cells into seminal fluid. They possess an unusual lipid composition and a tight and highly ordered structure of their lipid bilayer membrane, resembling that of lipid raft domains. Prostasomes appear to improve sperm motility and protect against attacks from the female immune defense during the passage to the egg.

The name prostasomes was coined in the early 1980s by combining the terms "prosta"=prostate and "soma" (Greek for "body"). Around this time, the first functional studies of prostasomes were also performed.

Cancerous prostate cells and prostate cells with low differentiation continue to produce and secrete prostasomes. Possibly, the high incidence of prostate cancer in elderly men could be due to the immunomodulatory properties of prostasomes, protecting the cancer from attack by the immune system.

Fusion of prostasomes with the sperm plasma membrane is required for regulation of different aspects of sperm function, such as motility and capacitation. Prostasomes have also been implicated in the interaction between prostatic cancer cells and their microenvironment.

Immune regulating proteins found in prostasomes include: amino-peptidase N (CD13); dipeptidyl-peptidase IV (CD26); enkephalinase (neutral endopeptidase, CD10); angiotensin converting enzyme (ACE, CD143); tissue factor TF (CD142, thromboplastin); decay accelerating factor (CD55); protectin (CD59, inhibitor of MAC) and complement regulatory membrane cofactor protein (CD46). Prostasomes also contain high levels of the divalent cations: Zn2+, Ca2+ and Mg2+.

Historical background of prostasome research

See also
 vesicles
 Membrane biophysics
 Lipidomics
 International Society for Extracellular Vesicles
 Journal of Extracellular Vesicles

References 

Organelles